Antimatter is the 1993 debut album of UK industrial band Cubanate. Notable among the tracks are "Body Burn" which is one of the band's most popular singles, and "Autonomy", which was featured in an instrumental version in the video game Gran Turismo alongside 3 tracks from Cubanate's Cyberia album.

Two versions of "Antimatter" were released. The original UK release was combined with tracks from the 1994 UK "Metal" EP, whilst some tracks from the original were dropped to create the 1995 U.S. version.

Track listing

UK release 
 "Black-Out" – 5:04
 "Body Burn" – 3:55
 "Revolution Time" – 5:20
 "Autonomy" – 4:36
 "Junky" – 4:54
 "Exert/Disorder" – 4:47
 "Sucker" – 5:38
 "Switch" – 4:30
 "Forceful" – 6:26
 "Body Burn (Ext. D-Code Mix)" – 4:47
 "Kill or Cure" – 3:46
 "Angeldust" – 6:30

U.S. release 
 "Body Burn" – 3:54
 "Angeldust" – 6:32
 "Autonomy" – 4:38
 "Metal (D-Code Hard Mix)" – 6:17
 "Junky" – 4:53
 "Blackout" – 5:02
 "Exert/Disorder" – 4:44
 "Forceful" – 6:26
 "Kill or Cure" – 3:46
 "Body Burn (D-Code Club Mix)" – 5:08
 "Angeltrance (D-Code Mix)" – 7:00
 "Junky (D-Code Industriance Mix)" – 9:22
 "Body Burn (Joolz Extended Mix)" – 4:58

References

1993 debut albums
Cubanate albums
Dynamica albums